Soul Exposed is the seventeenth album by American singer Melba Moore. It was released by Orpheus Music and Capitol Records on March 26, 1990. Her final release with Capitol, the album spawned the hits "Do You Really Want My Love" and "Lift Every Voice and Sing," the latter of which went to number nine on Billboards R&B chart.

Critical reception

AllMusic editor Ed Hogan found that Soul Exposed "seemed to touch on all of [Moore's] musical roots," while showing her "wide stylistic range." Entertainment Weeklys Greg Sandow felt that the album "starts off as danceable R&B, hard to distinguish from anyone else’s. At least it’s agreeable R&B. And Moore does sing it better than most. Even her characteristic squeals fall into place as a particularly energetic form of emphasis."

Track listing

Notes
 denotes co-producer

Charts

References

1990 albums
Melba Moore albums
Capitol Records albums